The  is a series of faults in Kumamoto Prefecture of Japan, which was responsible for the 2016 Kumamoto earthquakes.  It consists of two fault zones along the west coast of Kumamoto, stretching over 100 km, making it the longest fault zone in Kyushu. Parts of the fault were selected as natural monuments following the 2016 Kumamoto earthquakes.

References

Seismic faults of Japan
Geography of Kumamoto Prefecture